James “Jimmy” Topping (born 18 December 1974) is an Irish rugby former player and current coach. As a player, he won eight caps for the Ireland national rugby union team between 1996 and 2003, playing on the wing. Topping was born in Belfast and played his club rugby for Ballymena and Ulster.

Topping also played sevens for the Ireland national rugby sevens team. He played at the 2001 Rugby World Cup Sevens and also played several legs on the World Rugby Sevens Series.

Since retiring from playing, Topping has been involved in coaching, including Ulster youth rugby, and the Ireland national rugby sevens team.

References

Irish rugby union players
Ireland international rugby union players
Rugby union wings
Ulster Rugby players
Ballymena R.F.C. players
Living people
1974 births
Ireland international rugby sevens players
Rugby union players from Belfast
Irish rugby union coaches